Dragan Radojičić (born 3 June 1970) is a Montenegrin football manager and former player.

Playing career
Radojičić started out at his hometown club Sutjeska Nikšić, making 31 appearances and scoring eight goals in the Yugoslav Second League between 1988 and 1991. He also played for the club in the First League of FR Yugoslavia from 1992 to 1994. Before moving abroad in 1996, Radojičić spent two seasons at Vojvodina. He would later play professionally in Spain, Greece, and Hungary.

Managerial career
After hanging up his boots, Radojičić served as manager of numerous clubs in both Serbia and Montenegro. He began his career at Vojvodina as assistant manager under Dragoljub Bekvalac in the 2008–09 season. After the departure of Bekvalac in October, Radojičić held the role of caretaker manager and continued in the role of assistant manager after the appointment of Ljupko Petrović two months later.

In June 2012, Radojičić was appointed as manager of Montenegrin First League club Sutjeska Nikšić, winning back-to-back championship titles in 2013 and 2014.

Honours

Player
Debrecen
 Magyar Kupa: 2000–01

Manager
Sutjeska Nikšić
 Montenegrin First League: 2012–13, 2013–14

References

External links
 
 

1970 births
Living people
Footballers from Nikšić
Yugoslav footballers
Serbia and Montenegro footballers
Montenegrin footballers
Association football midfielders
FK Sutjeska Nikšić players
FK Vojvodina players
UD Las Palmas players
FK Budućnost Podgorica players
SKN St. Pölten players
Aris Thessaloniki F.C. players
Kavala F.C. players
Debreceni VSC players
Yugoslav Second League players
First League of Serbia and Montenegro players
Segunda División players
Super League Greece players
Nemzeti Bajnokság I players
Serbia and Montenegro expatriate footballers
Expatriate footballers in Spain
Expatriate footballers in Greece
Expatriate footballers in Hungary
Serbia and Montenegro expatriate sportspeople in Spain
Serbia and Montenegro expatriate sportspeople in Greece
Serbia and Montenegro expatriate sportspeople in Hungary
Montenegrin football managers
FK Vojvodina managers
RFK Novi Sad 1921 managers
OFK Grbalj managers
FK Rudar Pljevlja managers
FK Sutjeska Nikšić managers
FK Budućnost Podgorica managers
OFK Beograd managers
FK Proleter Novi Sad managers
FK Rad managers
FK Kolubara managers
FK Novi Pazar managers
Serbian SuperLiga managers
Montenegrin expatriate football managers
Expatriate football managers in Serbia
Montenegrin expatriate sportspeople in Serbia